The 1956 Norwegian Football Cup was the 51st season of the Norwegian annual knockout football tournament. The tournament was open for all members of NFF, except those from Northern Norway. The final was played at Ullevaal Stadion in Oslo on 21 October 1956, and was contested the defending champions Skeid, and Larvik Turn who contested their first final. Skeid successfully defended their title with a 5–0 victory in the final.

First round

|-
|colspan="3" style="background-color:#97DEFF"|Replay

|}

Second round

|-
|colspan="3" style="background-color:#97DEFF"|Replay

|}

Third round

|colspan="3" style="background-color:#97DEFF"|12 August 1956

|-
|colspan="3" style="background-color:#97DEFF"|Replay: 26 August 1956

|-
|colspan="3" style="background-color:#97DEFF"|Replay: 27 August 1956

|}

Fourth round

|colspan="3" style="background-color:#97DEFF"|2 September 1956

|}

Quarter-finals

|colspan="3" style="background-color:#97DEFF"|23 September 1956

|-
|colspan="3" style="background-color:#97DEFF"|Replay: 30 September 1956

|-
|colspan="3" style="background-color:#97DEFF"|2nd replay: 7 October 1956

|}

Semi-finals

|colspan="3" style="background-color:#97DEFF"|7 October 1956

|-
|colspan="3" style="background-color:#97DEFF"|14 October 1956

|-
|colspan="3" style="background-color:#97DEFF"|Replay: 17 October 1956

|}

Final

See also
1955–56 Norwegian Main League
1956 in Norwegian football

References

Norwegian Football Cup seasons
Norway
Cup